Kasem Baikam (born 1932) is a Thai footballer. He competed in the men's tournament at the 1956 Summer Olympics.

References

External links
 

1932 births
Living people
Kasem Baikam
Kasem Baikam
Kasem Baikam
Footballers at the 1956 Summer Olympics
Place of birth missing (living people)
Association football goalkeepers